The Phantom Buster is a 1927 American silent Western film directed by William Bertram and featuring Boris Karloff in a supporting role.

Plot
Bill Turner, a construction worker, steals from the corporate payroll for a gang and frames his lookalike Jeff McCloud for the crime. After Turner gets killed in an armed robbery by Jim Breed, Jeff escapes from prison and takes Turner's place in the gang, which is smuggling firearms across the Mexico–United States border. After an ambush McCloud is cared for by Babs, who was betrothed to Turner by her grandfather. Breed appears and reveals Jeff's ruse, but he and Babs are rescued by law enforcement.

Cast
 Buddy Roosevelt as Jeff McCloud / Bill Turner
 Alma Rayford as Babs
 Slim Whitaker as Cassidy (as Charles Whitaker)
 Boris Karloff as Ramon
 John Junior as Jim
 Walter Maly as Jack
 Lawrence Underwood as Sheriff

See also
 Boris Karloff filmography

References

External links
 

1927 films
1927 Western (genre) films
American black-and-white films
Films directed by William Bertram
Pathé Exchange films
Silent American Western (genre) films
1920s American films